Henry Grider (July 16, 1796 – September 7, 1866) was a United States representative from Kentucky. He was born in Garrard County, Kentucky. He pursued an academic course, studied law, and was admitted to the bar and commenced practice in Bowling Green, Kentucky.

Grider served in the War of 1812. After the war, he was a member of the Kentucky House of Representatives in 1827 and 1831. He also served in the Kentucky Senate 1833-1837. He was elected as a Whig to the Twenty-eighth and Twenty-ninth Congresses (March 4, 1843 – March 3, 1847) and elected as a Unionist to the Thirty-seventh and Thirty-eighth Congresses and as a Democrat to the Thirty-ninth Congress and served from March 4, 1861, until his death in Bowling Green, Kentucky in 1866. As a congressman, he served on the Joint Committee on Reconstruction which drafted the Fourteenth Amendment to the United States Constitution.  His vote on the Thirteenth Amendment is recorded as nay.  He was buried in Old College Street Cemetery.

See also
List of United States Congress members who died in office (1790–1899)

References
.  Includes Guide to Research Collections where his papers are located.

1796 births
1866 deaths
People from Garrard County, Kentucky
Kentucky Whigs
Whig Party members of the United States House of Representatives
19th-century American politicians
Unionist Party members of the United States House of Representatives from Kentucky
Kentucky Unionists
Democratic Party members of the United States House of Representatives from Kentucky
Members of the Kentucky House of Representatives
Kentucky state senators
People from Kentucky in the War of 1812